KrioRus is the first cryonics company in Russia. It was founded in 2005 by the Russian Transhumanist Movement NGO. It is the only cryonic company in Europe to possess an own cryonic storage. The company offers the services of freezing the entire bodies or heads of clients in liquid nitrogen with a plan to revive them if such a technology is developed, but takes no legal obligations to do so.

History 

KrioRus was founded in 2005 by a group of nine people who wanted to be cryogenically frozen along with their relatives to be revived in the future. Some of the company founders had past experience in the field of cryopreservation. For instance, in 2003, Igor ARyukhov was the chief advisor to the project that aimed to preserve the brain of a deceased biotechnologist.

The company was established as a project run by the Russian Transhumanist Movement NGO. The same year Lydia Fedorenko became the company's first client, yet by that time KrioRus had no cryogemic storage, and Fedorenko relatives had to store her brain with solid CO². By the mid-2010s the company had clients from the United States, Netherlands, Japan, Israel, Italy, Switzerland and Australia. Several relatives of KrioRus employees were put in cryogenic storage as well.

The second storage facility was launched in Sergiyevo-Posadsky District of Moscow Oblast in 2012. By 2016, the company planned to build another cryogenic storage near Tver and establish an R&D facility there.

According to KrioRus and press reports, as of August 15, 2019 the company has 70 people under care (36 bodies and 34 patients' heads), 10 dogs, 17 cats, both male and female, as well as 4 birds and a chinchilla. In addition, there are human and animal DNA samples in storage. Almost as many as 200 Russian citizens have entered into cryopreservation agreements with the company. KrioRus is considered to be one of the largest cryonics companies in the world competing with Alcor Life Extension Foundation (170 people in cryogenic storage) and some others. In addition, KrioRus is the first cryocompany in Europe, that possesses its own cryogenic storage facility.

The company has participated in a number of medical technology and funeral homes business exhibition in Russia and abroad, namely the Health Industry-2012(),  Necropolis (2013, 2014, 2015, and 2016), Necropolis-Siberia (2016),  TanExpo (2016). At 2013 Necropolis exhibition, the company received the gold medal for innovations.

Top management and staff 

Since 2009,  is the current CEO of KrioRus. The former Danila Medvedev is the chairman of the board of directors and a deputy CEO for strategic development. Director for Science is the biophysicist, Igor Artyukhov. Since 2016, there are 11 people listed as company founders including Valeria Udalova, Danila Medvedev, and Igor Artyukov. The R&D team is led by cryobiologist Yuri Pichugin, PhD, who previously worked in Cryonics Institute (USA, Detroit) from 2001 to 2007.

Activities 

KrioRus provides various services related to preservation of human and animal bodies and brains in liquid nitrogen. The company admits that the technology that would allow to "resurrect" cryogenically frozen people doesn't yet exist, and the success of the procedure depends entirely on the technological advancements in cryonics. The additional services include safekeeping of personal archives to help restore the clients' identities in the future.

The company is incorporated in Russia and works in a relatively new and unregulated field, which allows it to provide services at lower cost than its US-based rivals. It also plans to expand to countries such as Switzerland where euthanasia is legal, thus allowing for a more simple cryogenic conservation process. KrioRus R&F facilities are located in Moscow and in Voronezh and work on improving of frosting and defrosting methods and technologies. The company collaborates with the Russian  and other cryonics companies in the field of reversible organ deep-freeze technologies.

Legal aspects 

Legally speaking, the contract between KrioRus and its clients is designed as an agreement to participate in a scientific experiment, hence the customers have to accept the risks associated and acknowledge that the "revival" is not guaranteed. The contract covers the preservation of the bodies for up to 100 years. As KrioRus has a legal status of a scientific institution, its activities are not subject to certification.

Criticism 

Yevgeny Alexandrov, the chair of the Russian Academy of Sciences commission against pseudoscience, has said that there is no scientific basis for cryonics and that the company's offering is based on unfounded speculations.

See also 
 Alcor Life Extension Foundation
 American Cryonics Society
 Cryonics Institute
 Shandong Yinfeng Life Science Research Institute

Notes

References

External links 
 

 
 Publications about KrioRus 
 History of KrioRus
 *
 
 How to Cheat Death and Freeze Time in Russia (Bloomberg)

Technology companies of Russia
Cryonics organizations
Companies based in Moscow
Russian brands